Several different Minor League Baseball teams have been located in the city of Waterbury, Connecticut since 1884.

Teams

Connecticut State League teams
The earliest Waterbury teams played in the Connecticut State League between 1884 and 1912. These teams went by several different nicknames during this period, including the Brassmen, Brass City, Indians, Pirates, Rough Riders, Authors, Invisibles, Finnegans, Champs and Spuds.

Waterbury Brasscos
The Waterbury Brasscos (also called the Nattatucks) played in the Eastern League from 1918 to 1928. They won two league titles in 1924 and 1925.

Waterbury Timers
The Waterbury Timers played in the Colonial League between 1947 and 1950.

Eastern League MLB affiliate
Waterbury became home to professional baseball again in 1966 when the Waterbury Giants, an affiliate of Major League Baseball's San Francisco Giants came to town. From 1966-1986 (with the exception of 1972), the Waterbury team played in the Eastern League as an affiliate of the Giants, Cleveland Indians, Pittsburgh Pirates, Los Angeles Dodgers, Oakland Athletics, Cincinnati Reds and California Angels. The team name changed every time the affiliation agreement changed hands. Waterbury did not have an Eastern League team at the start of the 1972 season. However, midway through the season, flooding in Elmira, New York made the home ballpark of the Elmira Pioneers unusable, forcing them to play their "home games" in the second half of the 1972 season in Waterbury.

Waterbury Spirit
The Independent Northeast League chose to place a team in Waterbury in 1997 as the Waterbury Spirit, but they folded after the 2000 season, only to be resurrected in 2003 under a new owner, relocating to Lynn, Massachusetts and becoming the North Shore Spirit.

See also 
 Professional baseball in Connecticut

References

External links
Baseball Waterbury heritage

Defunct Eastern League (1938–present) teams
Defunct Colonial League teams
Defunct Eastern Association teams
Defunct Connecticut State League teams
Defunct Connecticut League teams
Defunct Southern New England League teams
Cleveland Guardians minor league affiliates
California Angels minor league affiliates
Cincinnati Reds minor league affiliates
Oakland Athletics minor league affiliates
San Francisco Giants minor league affiliates
Los Angeles Dodgers minor league affiliates
Pittsburgh Pirates minor league affiliates
Baseball in Connecticut
Waterbury, Connecticut
Professional baseball teams in Connecticut
Defunct baseball teams in Connecticut
Baseball teams established in 1884
Baseball teams disestablished in 1986